John Hammond (born 1923, date of death unknown) was a Grey Cup champion Canadian Football League player. He played offensive guard. A native of Winnipeg, Hammond first played senior football with the Regina All Services team in 1943, and later attended University of Washington. In 1946 he joined his hometown Winnipeg Blue Bombers, playing in their Grey Cup loss to the Toronto Argonauts. He then went east to study engineering at McGill University and played with the Montreal Alouettes in 1947.  He was one of the "unsung heroes" of the Larks first Grey Cup championship in 1949. He played 40 games for the Als over 5 seasons.

References

External links
Just Sports Stats
Profile of John Hammond

1923 births
Year of death missing
Montreal Alouettes players
Winnipeg Blue Bombers players
McGill University Faculty of Engineering alumni
Players of Canadian football from Manitoba
Canadian football people from Winnipeg
University of Washington alumni